Taylor Robertson (born September 8, 1980) is a retired pro football offensive guard. He most recently played for the Toronto Argonauts of the Canadian Football League. He was drafted in the 2nd round of the 2003 CFL Draft by the Calgary Stampeders. He played college football at UCF.  Robertson has also been a member of the Philadelphia Eagles.  

Taylor is currently a pit crew member for Fitzpatrick Motorsports in the NASCAR Canadian Tire Series.

College football

Taylor started his 4-year college football career on full athletic scholarship at UCF of the NCAA in January 1999.  Playing immediately as a true freshman after making the transition from tight end to guard during spring and fall camp, Taylor saw action in all 22 games his first two seasons as a backup. Taylor became a starter his junior year at guard and by the end of his senior season, Taylor was arguably the Golden Knights' best run blocker and was named second-team All-MAC.

Pro football

Taylor first started his professional career in the NFL with the Philadelphia Eagles, following his release from the Eagles, Taylor made his way to the CFL where he was drafted 11th overall by the Calgary Stampeders. Taylor played his first four years in the CFL with the Stamps before being traded to the Toronto Argonauts where he played five more seasons until his retirement in 2012.

During his 9-year CFL career, Taylor was named CFL Division All-Star (07) and team nominee for CFL Most Outstanding Lineman 3 years in a row (07,08,09). In addition Taylor was also part of an offensive line in 2006 that won the CFL award for fewest sacks allowed, while also being named CFL lineman of the week during that same season. During Taylor’s CFL career he started 137 regular season & playoff games at right guard, more notable starting 128 of those consecutively without missing a single play.

NASCAR

In 2012 following his retirement from the CFL, Taylor joined Fitzpatrick Motorsports as a pit crew member and will handle both the duties of Jackman and Gas Man for the #84 Equipment Express Chevrolet driven by J. R. Fitzpatrick in the NASCAR Canadian Tire Series.

Philanthropy

While becoming a professional athlete, Taylor has been involved in numerous community programs, including: visits to children’s hospitals, speaking at youth jails and rehabilitation centres in the U.S. and Canada, and speaking with thousands of kids throughout the GTA with an anti-bullying program. A lot of Taylor’s time in the community has been spent being an advocate for breast cancer awareness. Through his professional career, he has formed partnerships between numerous CFL teams and national cancer charitable organizations, as well as playing an intricate role in bringing ‘Pink’ to the CFL. Taylor is also the founder of Life on the Line, a non-profit organization that aims to heighten Canadians' awareness about breast cancer, and raise funds to support breast cancer research, help those battling the disease, and celebrate survivors and their families. Taylor launched this initiative after losing his mother to breast cancer when he was just 7 years old.

External links

Taylor Robertson Official Website
Life On The Line Website

1980 births
Living people
American football offensive guards
Calgary Stampeders players
Canadian football offensive linemen
Canadian players of American football
Philadelphia Eagles players
Players of Canadian football from Ontario
Sportspeople from Brantford
Toronto Argonauts players
UCF Knights football players